Yarwell Junction is the current western terminus of the Nene Valley Railway. It opened at Easter 2007.

It was formerly the junction of the Peterborough to Northampton and Peterborough to Market Harborough lines. In  April 2006 a track realignment made space for a platform, and this was constructed during 2007. There was never previously a station on the site. The new station is served by footpaths to Nassington and the mill village of Yarwell, but there is no vehicular access.

Yarwell Junction is situated approximately just 1 mile west of Wansford station, at the western end of the 616 yard long Wansford Tunnel, (the fourth longest tunnel on a UK Heritage Railway within preservation).

External links

Nene Valley Railway
Heritage railway stations in Cambridgeshire
Transport in Peterborough
Buildings and structures in Peterborough
Railway stations built for UK heritage railways
Railway stations in Great Britain opened in 2007
Railway stations in Great Britain without road access